Slipping Out is the eighth studio album by American soul-disco group, The Trammps, released in 1980 through Atlantic Records. The album and the singles "Looking for You" and "Breathtaking View" all failed to chart.

Track listing

Personnel
The Trammps
Jimmy Ellis
Robert Upchurch 
Earl Young
Stanley Wade 
Harold Wade

Additional personnel
LeCoy Bryant – lead guitar, rhythm guitar
Danny Harrs – guitar solo on "Is There Any Room for Me"
Kevin Douglas – bass guitar
Emanuel Redding – percussion
James Drumgole – trumpet, flugelhorn
Gregory McCoy – soprano saxophone, alto saxophone, tenor saxophone, Fender Rhodes piano, Clavinet, string ensemble, ARP Omni II, Prophet 5 synthesizer
Samuel Williams – drums on "Looking for You" and "Our Thought (Slipping Away)"
Ricardo Williams – drums, string ensemble, Prophet 5 synthesizer
Tyrone Williams – Yamaha grand piano, Fender Rhodes electric piano, Yamaha electric grand piano, Clavinet, Korg bass synthesizer, string ensemble, ARP Omni II, Minimoog, Prophet 5 keyboards, all keyboard solos

References

External links

1980 albums
The Trammps albums
Atlantic Records albums